Aziz Balagoun (born 8 April 1981 in Porto Novo) is a Beninese international footballer. He currently plays in Belgium for K.M.S.K. Deinze.

Career 
Balagoun left Royal Leopold Ukkel FC in summer 2008 and signed a contract with R.C. Sartois. After six months with the club, he was transferred to K.M.S.K. Deinze.

Balagoun previously played for Génération 2000 FC, Espoir Plus FC, UNB FC (Benin), Bury F.C. and FC Saint Josse.

International career 
He played his first game for Benin 2005.

References

External links 
 Profile by KMSK Deinze

1981 births
Living people
Beninese footballers
Benin international footballers
Expatriate footballers in Belgium
Beninese expatriate sportspeople in Belgium
Beninese expatriate sportspeople in England
Expatriate footballers in England
K.M.S.K. Deinze players
Yoruba sportspeople
People from Porto-Novo
Association football goalkeepers